Vakalalabure is a Fijian surname. Notable people with the surname include:

Rakuita Vakalalabure (born 1962), Fijian lawyer and politician
Tevita Vakalalabure (1927–2005), Fijian chief and politician

Fijian-language surnames